Hisamatsu is a Japanese surname. Notable people with the surname include:

, Japanese manga artist and character designer
, Japanese daimyō
, Japanese fashion model, gravure idol, television personality and actress
, Japanese film director
, Japanese tennis player
, Japanese Zen Buddhist scholar, philosopher and tea master

Japanese-language surnames